Austin Peace Academy (APA) is an Islamic school in Austin, Texas, serving pre-kindergarten through grade 12. As of 2016, its students originate from 19 nationalities. It opened in 1997 in West Campus, housing pre-kindergarten, and moved to current location in 1999. The school received its current name in 2003.

History

The Muslim community in Austin founded Austin Peace Academy to meet the crucial challenge of stimulating the minds of the students who enroll in the school while at the same time enabling them to preserve their Islamic identity, heritage and practices.

Austin Peace Academy was established in 1997 in a small building with about sixteen students as the first Islamic school in Austin. The school was initially named Peace Elementary School. In its inaugural year, the school offered Pre-K to Kindergarten (KG).
In 1997, the school was moved to its current location at 5110 Manor Road.

In 2003, the school was renamed Austin Peace Academy which serves students from Pre-school to 12th grade. The school has a diverse body of students whose parents come from 19 nationalities.

In November 2005, Austin Peace Academy was approved for accreditation candidacy by the Southern Association of Colleges and Schools (SACS).

In April 2007, the Southern Association of Colleges and Schools (SACS) recommended Austin Peace Academy for accreditation. In December 2007, at the SACS annual meetings, Austin Peace Academy received its accreditation.

In 2021, Austin Peace Academy has started adding fences to work on some new building.

In 2016, Niche ranked Austin Peace Academy the 2nd best private K-12 school in the Austin area.

References

External links
 Austin Peace Academy

Islamic schools in Texas
High schools in Austin, Texas
Education in Austin, Texas
Private K-12 schools in Texas